Maclin is both a given name and a surname. Notable people with the name include:

Maclin Cody (born 1972), American football player
Jeremy Maclin (born 1988), American football player
Lonnie Maclin (born 1967), American baseball player

See also
Macklin (surname)